Oxynoemacheilus ceyhanensis, the Elbistan loach, is a species of Cypriniformes fish in the stone loach genus Oxynoemacheilus. It is found in moderately fast flowing streams with gravel or rocky beds and is known only from the Elbistan in upper drainage of the Ceyhan River in south eastern Turkey.

References 

ceyhanensis
Endemic fauna of Turkey
Fish described in 2007
Taxa named by Füsun Erk'akan
Taxa named by Teodor T. Nalbant
Taxa named by Cevher Özeren